The Helm of Awe or Helm of Terror (Icelandic: Ægishjálmur, Old Norse Œgishjalmr) is an object in Norse mythology and subsequently the name of an Icelandic magical stave. The symbol used for the reference in the sagas came from the Huld manuscript written and collected in 1847, and has no previous attestations. The symbol was used as a part of a Christian magic ritual that may have had some movements rooted in Icelandic culture, but was very common ritualistic practice across Christendom.

Medieval attestations
A physical object called the "Helm of Terror" is referenced as one item Sigurd takes from the dragon Fafnir's hoard after he slays him in Völsunga saga. Stanza 16 of Fáfnismál in the Poetic Edda also mentions:

In the next couple stanza's of the poem, Sigurd and Fafnir banter back and forth about the helmet stating that even the bravest of men who see the helm cower in fear.

Stanza 19 alludes to the owner of the helm being a hated individual. This may indicate that the item has not only the power to instill fear, but resentment.

Symbol
In one of the Icelandic author's writings the aegir referenced to giants who wore helmets that shot beams of light and pierced their foes.

Link between the item and symbol
While it is debated whether the Helm of Awe may have been an actual helm, in Medieval sources, it never references a symbol such as that recorded in the modern period. The very popular symbol as shown on the side has no reference to "Viking Culture" and isn't related to the "Helm of Terror" (Despite having near the same name).
The meaning of the word used to define the helm seemed to change as years went on, going from a physical object to voracious trait of striking fear into one with a glance.

See also
 Sigil - a type of magical symbol
 Vegvísir - another Icelandic magical stave first recorded in the modern period

References

Magic symbols
Mythological objects
Sources of Norse mythology
Völsung cycle